Haute cuisine or grande cuisine is the cuisine of "high-level" establishments, gourmet restaurants, and luxury hotels. Haute cuisine is characterized by the meticulous preparation and careful presentation of food at a high price.

Early history
Haute cuisine represents the cooking and eating of carefully prepared food from regular and premium ingredients, prepared by specialists, and commissioned by those with the financial means to do so.  It has had a long evolution through the monarchy and the bourgeoisie and their ability to explore and afford prepared dishes with exotic and varied flavors and looking like architectural wonders. Haute cuisine distinguished itself from regular French cuisine by what was cooked and served, by obtaining premium ingredients such as fruit out of season, and by using ingredients not typically found in France.

Trained kitchen staff was essential to the birth of haute cuisine in France, which was organized at the turn of the century by August Escoffier into the brigade de cuisine. The extravagant presentations and complex techniques that came from these kitchens required ingredients, time, equipment, and therefore money. For this reason, early haute cuisine was accessible to a small demographic of rich and powerful individuals. Not only were professional chefs responsible for building and shaping haute cuisine, but their role in the cuisine was what differentiated it from regular French cuisine.

Haute cuisine is influenced by French cuisine with elaborate preparations and presentations that serves small, multiple courses prepared by a hierarchical kitchen staff, historically at the grand restaurants and hotels of Europe. The cuisine was very rich and opulent, with decadent sauces made out of butter, cream, and flour, the basis for many typical French sauces still in use today. The 17th-century chef and writer La Varenne (1615-1678) marked a change from cookery as known in the Middle Ages, to somewhat lighter dishes, and more modest presentations. Subsequently,  Antonin Carême (1784-1833) also published works on cooking, and he simplified and codified an earlier and even more complex cuisine. Nineteenth-century French haute cuisine interacted with the development of fine dining in Britain.

Cuisine classique

Georges Auguste Escoffier is a central figure in the modernisation of haute cuisine as of about 1900, which became known as cuisine classique. These were simplifications and refinements of the early work of Carême, Jules Gouffé and Urbain Dubois. It was practised in the grand restaurants and hotels of Europe and elsewhere for much of the 20th century. The major developments were to replace service à la française (serving all dishes at once) with service à la russe (serving meals in courses) and to develop a system of cookery, based on Escoffier's Le Guide Culinaire, which formalized the preparation of sauces and dishes.  In its time, it was considered the pinnacle of haute cuisine, and was a style distinct from cuisine bourgeoise (the cuisine of affluent city dwellers), the working-class cuisine of bistros and homes, and cuisines of the French provinces.

Nouvelle cuisine

The 1960s were marked by the appearance of nouvelle cuisine, as chefs rebelled from Escoffier's "orthodoxy" and complexity. Although the term nouvelle cuisine had been used in the past, the modern usage can be attributed to authors André Gayot, Henri Gault, and Christian Millau, who used nouvelle cuisine to describe the cooking of Paul Bocuse, Alain Chapel, Jean and Pierre Troisgros, Michel Guérard, Roger Vergé and Raymond Oliver, many of whom were once students of Fernand Point.

In general, nouvelle cuisine puts an emphasis on natural flavours, so the freshest possible ingredients are used, preparation is simplified, heavy sauces are less common, as are strong marinades for meat, and cooking times are often reduced. Nouvelle cuisine was a movement towards conceptualism and minimalism and was a direct juxtaposition to earlier haute cuisine styles of cooking, which were much more extravagant. While menus were increasingly short, dishes used more inventive pairings and relied on inspiration from regional dishes.
 
Within 20 years, however, chefs began returning to the earlier style of haute cuisine, although many of the new techniques remained.

References

Further reading
 Cooking, Cuisine and Class, A Study in Comparative Sociology, Jack Goody, University of Cambridge, June 1982, 
 Food and love: a cultural history of East and West By Jack Goody, Verso (April 1999), 
 Tasting food, tasting freedom: excursions into eating, culture, and the past by Sidney Wilfred Mintz Beacon Press (1997) - 
 Viandier attributed to Guillaume Tirel dit Taillevent, medieval manuscript
 Haute Cuisine: How the French Invented the Culinary Profession By Amy B. Trubek, University of Pennsylvania Press (December 2000), 
 Food culture in France By Julia Abramson, Greenwood Press (November 2006), 
 Patrick Rambourg, Histoire de la cuisine et de la gastronomie françaises, Paris, Ed. Perrin (coll. tempus n° 359), 2010, 381 pages. 

French cuisine
Cuisine
Historical foods